is a Japanese dancer, model and actress. She is a former member of J-Pop group E-girls and Flower and exclusive model for the Japanese fashion magazine Ray.

Sato is represented with LDH.

Early life 
Harumi Sato was born on June 8, 1995 in Yamagata Prefecture, Japan. Prior to auditioning to LDH, Sato took dance classes at Dance Studio MPF from the second grade of elementary school to second grade of junior high school. Afterwards, she was a student at Dance Studio ViVid in Fukushima Prefecture.

Career 
On July 26, 2011, it was revealed during an E-Girls SHOW event at SHIBUYA-AX that Sato was one of the winners in the dance section of the VOCAL BATTLE AUDITION 3 and thus would be added to Flower as a performer alongside Nozomi Bando. On the same day, she was also added as a performer of E-girls, being a member of both groups at the same time. On October 12, Flower debuted with the single "Still".

In March 2012, Sato made her modeling debut by participating in the Tokyo Girls Collection.

On July 22, 2013, it was announced that she would be working as an exclusive model of the fashion magazine Ray starting from its September issue.

In January 2014, she debuted as an actress in the TV drama A Perfect Day For Love Letters.

In January 2017, she appeared on the cover of Ray's March issue, being her first solo magazine cover in her career as a model. On August 29 in the same year, she released her first photobook titled Harumiiro (ハルミイロ). Furthermore, Sato was appointed as E-girls' leader in late October after the group's reformulation.

On August 3, 2018, she participated as a special performer in the DANCE ALIVE WORLD CUP 2018 at Saitama Super Arena. There, she performed together with Fabulous Sisters, a dance team of her former dance school Dance Studio ViVid.

On September 6, 2019, she was invited to attend the runway show of the Tommy Hilfiger x Zendaya collection during New York Fashion Week, being her first international fashion event. On September 30, Flower disbanded and Sato remained as member of E-girls. On December 22, with the announcement of E-girls' disbandment set for around the end of 2020, it was revealed that she would focus on acting and modeling activities afterwards.

Personal life 
Sato is the tallest member of Flower and E-girls (173 cm, 5 ft 8 in). Together with Kaede, second tallest E-girls member and tallest member of Happiness (168 cm, 5 ft 6 in), she forms the model duo Twin Tower. The duo started as a nickname from fans but became official soon after. Together, they have appeared in several magazines and commercials such as GQ Japan, CanCam, and VOGUE GIRL.

Filmography

Films

TV Dramas

Stage

Commercials

References

External links 
 Kprofiles

Japanese female dancers
Japanese female models
21st-century Japanese actresses
People from Yamagata Prefecture
1995 births
Living people
LDH (company) artists
Models from Yamagata Prefecture